The team jumping event at the 2010 Summer Youth Olympics in Singapore took place from August 18 to August 20 at the Singapore Turf Riding Club.  Riders competed in teams based on geographical origin where in two rounds of jumping the team with the fewest penalties would win.  Only the best 3 rider's score in each team will count towards the team score.  A jump-off will be played should teams in medal positions be tied.

Medalists

Results

Round 1

Round 2

Gold Medal Jump-Off

References
 Round 1 Results
 Round 2 and Jump-Off Results

Equestrian at the 2010 Summer Youth Olympics
2010 in equestrian